DXKO-TV, Channel 5, is a television station of Radio Philippines Network. Its transmitter is located at Barangay Gusa, Cagayan de Oro.

See also 
 CNN Philippines
 Nine Media Corporation
 Radio Philippines Network
 List of Radio Philippines Network affiliate stations

Television stations in Cagayan de Oro
Television channels and stations established in 1965
Radio Philippines Network stations